Riccardo Carapellese (1 July 1922 – 20 October 1995) was an Italian football manager and player who played as a striker.

Club career
Carapellese started his career in the 1942–43 season with Spezia in Serie B where he played 19 games and scored 3 goals. After a stint with Como, he debuted in Serie A with Milan, in which he remained until 1949 and gained a place in the national team. In the 1949–50 season, after the Grande Torino Superga tragedy, he was acquired by Torino, inheriting the captain's armband from Valentino Mazzola. 

In 1952 he moved to Torino's cross-city rivals Juventus, playing for the Bianconeri for only a season, after which he went to Genoa. In 1957 he returned to Serie B with Catania where he ended his career in 1959. In total, he played 318 matches throughout his career and scored 111 goals.

International career
With the Italy national football team, Carapellese made his debut in November 1947 in a 5–1 away defeat against Austria, scoring the only goal of the match for Italy. He participated at the 1950 FIFA World Cup as Italy's captain, scoring two goals in his nation's matches with Sweden and Paraguay.

Personal life
Carapellese was born in Cerignola, province of Foggia. He died in Rapallo in 1995 at 73 years of age.

References

 
 

1922 births
1995 deaths
People from Cerignola
Italian footballers
Italy international footballers
Association football forwards
Serie A players
Serie B players
Spezia Calcio players
Como 1907 players
A.C. Milan players
Torino F.C. players
Juventus F.C. players
Genoa C.F.C. players
Catania S.S.D. players
1950 FIFA World Cup players
Vigevano Calcio players
Footballers from Apulia
Sportspeople from the Province of Foggia